This article lists awards and nominations received by the television show Buffy the Vampire Slayer and its spinoff, Angel.

Buffy the Vampire Slayer

Awards won
Emmy Awards:
Outstanding Makeup for a Series, "Surprise/Innocence" (1998)
Outstanding Music Composition for a Series (Dramatic Underscore), "Becoming, Part One" (1998)

Golden Satellite Awards:
 Outstanding TV Ensemble (2002)

Hugo Awards:
 Best Dramatic Presentation, Short Form "Conversations with Dead People" (2002)

Saturn Awards:
 Best Network TV Series (1998, 2001, 2002)
 Best Supporting Actor in a TV Series James Marsters (2001, 2004)
 Best Supporting Actress in TV Series Alyson Hannigan (2003)
 Cinescape Face of the Future Emma Caulfield also for Darkness Falls (2003)
 Cinescape Face of the Future James Marsters (2002)
 Best Actress in a TV Series Sarah Michelle Gellar (1999)

Television Critics Association Awards:
 Heritage Award (2003)

Viewers for Quality Television Awards:
 Founder's Award (2000)

Visual Effects Society Awards:
Outstanding Visual Effects in a Television Series for Chosen (2004)

Nominations
American Film Institute Awards:
 Best Drama Series (2001)

Emmy Awards:
Outstanding Hairstyling for a Series "Beer Bad" (2000)
Outstanding Cinematography for a Single Camera Series "Hush" (2000)
Outstanding Writing for a Drama Series "Hush" (2000)
Outstanding Hairstyling For A Series "Hell's Bells" (2002)
Outstanding Makeup (non-prosthetic) For A Series "Hell's Bells" (2002)
Outstanding Makeup (prosthetic) For A Series "Hell's Bells" (2002)
Outstanding Music Direction "Once More with Feeling" (2002)
Outstanding Special Visual Effects For A Series "Chosen" (2003)

Golden Globe Awards:
 Best Actress in a TV Series-Drama Sarah Michelle Gellar (2001)

Golden Satellite Awards:
 Best TV Series-Drama (2003)
 Best Performance by an Actress in a Series-Drama Sarah Michelle Gellar (2003)
 Best Performance TV Supporting Actress- TV Drama Emma Caulfield (2003)
 Best Performance TV Supporting Actress- TV Drama Alyson Hannigan (2003)
 Best Performance TV Supporting Actor- TV Drama James Marsters (2003)

Hugo Awards:
 Best Dramatic Presentation, Short Form - "Chosen" (2003)
 Best Dramatic Presentation - "Once More, with Feeling" (2001)

Nebula Awards:
 Best Script - "The Body" (2001)
 Best Script - "Once More, with Feeling" (2002)

Saturn Awards:
 Best Actress in a TV Series Sarah Michelle Gellar (1998, 2000–2004)
 Best Network TV Series (1999, 2000, 2003, 2004)
 Best Supporting Actor in a TV series James Marsters (2000, 2002, 2003)
 Best Supporting Actress in a TV series Michelle Trachtenberg (2001–2003) 
 Best Supporting Actress in a TV series Alyson Hannigan (2001, 2002) 
 Best Supporting Actor in a TV series Anthony Stewart Head (2001)
 Best Supporting Actor in a TV series Nicholas Brendon (2000)
 Best Actor in a TV Series Nicholas Brendon (1998, 1999)

Teen Choice Awards:

 Choice TV Show: Throwback (2017)

Television Critics Association Awards:
 Program of the Year (2000, 2001)
 Outstanding Achievement in Drama (2000, 2001)
 Individual Achievement in Drama Sarah Michelle Gellar (2001)

Viewers for Quality Television Awards:
 Best Actress in a Quality Drama Series Sarah Michelle Gellar (1999)

Angel

Awards won

International Horror Guild Award:

 Best Television (2001)

Saturn Awards:

 Best Network TV Series (2004)
 Best Actor in a TV Series David Boreanaz (2000, 2003, 2004)
 Best Supporting Actor in a TV Series James Marsters (2004)
 Best Supporting Actress in a TV Series Amy Acker (2004)

Nominations

Emmy Awards:

 Outstanding Makeup for a Series Dayne Johnson (2000)

Hugo Awards:

 Hugo Award for Best Dramatic Presentation, Short Form - Not Fade Away (2005)
 Hugo Award for Best Dramatic Presentation, Short Form - Smile Time (2005)
 Hugo Award for Best Dramatic Presentation, Short Form - Waiting in the Wings (2003)

International Horror Guild Award:

 Best Television (2003, 2004)

Saturn Awards:

 Best Network TV Series (2000, 2001, 2002, 2003, 2005)
 Best Actor in a TV Series David Boreanaz (2001, 2002)
 Best Actress in a TV Series Charisma Carpenter (2001, 2003) 
 Best Supporting Actor in a TV Series Alexis Denisof (2001, 2003, 2004)
 Best Supporting Actor in a TV Series James Marsters (2005)
 Best Supporting Actress in a TV Series Amy Acker (2003, 2005)
 Best Supporting Actress in a TV Series Charisma Carpenter (2000, 2004)
 Best Supporting Actress in a TV Series Juliet Landau (2001)
 Cinescape Face of the Future Amy Acker (2002)

Satellite Awards:

 Best Performance by an Actor in a TV Series-Drama David Boreanaz (2004)
 Best Performance by an Actor in a Supporting Role-Drama Andy Hallett (2004)
 Best Performance by an Actress in a Supporting Role-Drama Amy Acker (2004)
 Best Performance by an Actress in a Supporting Role-Drama Gina Torres (2004)

The series also won and was nominated for many more awards from many other award groups such as the American Choreography Awards, the Hollywood Makeup Artist and Hair Stylist Guild Awards, the Motion Picture Sound Editors awards, the TV Guide Awards and the Teen Choice Awards.

External links
Buffy the Vampire Slayer - Awards at the Internet Movie Database
Angel - Awards at the Internet Movie Database
 Golden Satellite Awards

Awards
Awards
Buffy the Vampire Slayer